The 1976 African Men's Handball Championship was the second edition of the African Men's Handball Championship, held in Algiers, Algeria, from 10 to 18 April 1976. It acted as the African qualifying tournament for the 1976 Summer Olympics in Montreal.

In the final, Tunisia won their second title to beat Egypt, however Egypt was disqualified and the hosts Algeria took second place.

Qualified teams

Venue

Group stage 
All times are local (UTC+1).

Group A

Group B

Knockout stage

Fifth place game

Third place game

Final

Final ranking 
Egypt finished 2nd however it was disqualified. So Algeria third finished 2nd and Cameroon 3rd.

References 

1976 Men
Handball
African Men's Handball Championship
African Men's Handball Championship
Handball in Algeria
20th century in Algiers
April 1976 sports events in Africa